Plinthocoelium is a genus of beetles in the family Cerambycidae, containing the following species:

 Plinthocoelium chilense (Blanchard in Gay, 1851)
 Plinthocoelium cobaltinum (LeConte, 1873)
 Plinthocoelium domingoense (Fisher, 1922)
 Plinthocoelium koppei Schmidt, 1924
 Plinthocoelium schwarzi (Fisher, 1914)
 Plinthocoelium suaveolens (Linnaeus, 1768)
 Plinthocoelium virens (Drury, 1770)
 Plinthocoelium xanthogastrum (Bates, 1880)

References

Callichromatini